IGFC may refer to:

 Indian Gymkhana F.C.
 Iraqi Ground Forces Command